Miś z okienka (lit. The Bear from the Window) was a Polish educational children's television series or wieczorynka emitted in Telewizja Polska from 1957 to 1973. It was based on the BBC series Whirligig, led by Humphrey Lestocq. The show consisted of the bear (miś) and the presenter talking about topics from books that they read together. The presenters were Bronisław Pawlik and Stanisław Wyszyński, which were onscreen in said order.

References 

Polish television series
Fictional teddy bears
1957 television series debuts
1973 Polish television series endings